Anna Karolína Schmiedlová was the defending champion, but lost in the first round to Pauline Parmentier.

Dominika Cibulková won the title, defeating Camila Giorgi in the final, 6–4, 6–0.

Seeds

Draw

Finals

Top half

Bottom half

Qualifying

Seeds

Qualifiers

Lucky losers

Draw

First qualifier

Second qualifier

Third qualifier

Fourth qualifier

References
Main Draw
Qualifying Draw

Katowice Open - Singles
2016 Singles